No defending champions were officially declared as the last edition dates back to 1973, which was won by Tom Gorman and Erik van Dillen.

Todd Woodbridge and Mark Woodforde won the title by defeating Mansour Bahrami and Andrei Olhovskiy 6–3, 6–1 in the final.

Seeds

Draw

Draw

References

External links
 Official results archive (ATP)
 Official results archive (ITF)

1991 Copenhagen Open – 2
1991 ATP Tour